Blastobasis manto is a moth in the family Blastobasidae. It is found in Costa Rica.

The length of the forewings is about 5.9 mm. The forewings are pale brown intermixed with brown scales. The hindwings are translucent pale brown.

Etymology
The specific name refers to Manto, daughter of the Theban seer Tiresias.

References

Moths described in 2013
Blastobasis